Nirad Chandra Chaudhuri (23 November 1897 –  1 August 1999) was an Indian writer.

In 1990, Oxford University awarded Chaudhuri, by then a long-time resident of the city of Oxford, an Honorary Degree in Letters. In 1992, he was made an honorary Commander of the Order of the British Empire (CBE).

Biography
Chaudhuri was born in Kishoregunj, Mymensingh, East Bengal, British India (now Bangladesh), the second of eight children of Upendra Narayan Chaudhuri, a lawyer, and of Sushila Sundarani Chaudhurani. His parents were liberal middle-class Hindus who belonged to the Brahmo Samaj movement.

Chaudhuri was a prolific writer even in the last years of his life, publishing his last work at the age of 99. His wife Amiya Chaudhuri died in 1994 in Oxford, England. He too died in Oxford, three months short of his 102nd birthday, in 1999. He lived at 20 Lathbury Road from 1982 until his death and a blue plaque was installed by the Oxfordshire Blue Plaques Board in 2008.

Dr. Sumantra Maitra named him the forgotten visionary of British India, in a review essay for The Spectator.

Major works
His masterpiece, The Autobiography of an Unknown Indian, published in 1951, put him on the long list of great Indian writers. Chaudhari had said that The Autobiography of an Unknown Indian is 'more of an exercise in descriptive ethnology than autobiography'. He is concerned with describing the conditions  in which an Indian grew to manhood in the early decades of the century, and as he feels that the basic principle of book is that environment shall have precedence over its product; he describes its affectionate and sensuous detail the three places that had the greatest influence on him: Kishoreganj,the country town in which he lived till he was twelve; Bangram; his ancestral village; and Kalikutch, his mother's village. A fourth chapter is devoted to England, which occupied a large place in his imagination. Later in the book he talks about Calcutta, the Bengali Renaissance, the beginnings of the nationalist Movement, and his experience of Englishmen in India as opposed to the idyllic pictures of a civilization he considered perhaps the greatest in the world. These themes remains preoccupations in most of Chaudhari's work, as does his deterministic view of culture and politics.  He courted controversy in the newly independent India due to the dedication of the book, which ran thus:

To the memory of the British Empire in India,
Which conferred subjecthood upon us,
But withheld citizenship.
To which yet every one of us threw out the challenge:
"Civis Britannicus sum"
Because all that was good and living within us
Was made, shaped and quickened
By the same British rule.

It is sometimes stated that 'Chaudhuri was hounded out of government service, deprived of his pension, blacklisted as a writer in India and forced to live a life of penury'. However, as Sociologist Edward Shils, who helped Chaudhuri immigrate to the UK, stated in his article 'Citizen of the World' (American Scholar, 1988), Chaudhuri retired at the compulsory age of 55 but was not eligible for a pension because he had not completed sufficient years of service. It is also stated that-'Furthermore, he had to give up his job as a political commentator in All India Radio as the Government of India promulgated a law that prohibited employees from publishing memoirs.' This is not the case. There was a pre-existing rule that employees must get clearance before publishing anything. Chadhuri was refused an extension of service. He was not asked to prepare any more talks on a free-lance basis because of severe criticism directed at him by senior figures- like Krishna Menon. However, he did publish in non-Government magazines. 
Chaudhuri argued that his critics were not careful-enough readers; "the dedication was really a condemnation of the British rulers for not treating us as equals", he wrote in a 1997 special edition of Granta. Typically, to demonstrate his perceptions he drew on a parallel with Ancient Rome. The book's dedication, Chaudhuri observed, "was an imitation of what Cicero said about the conduct of Verres, a Roman proconsul of Sicily who oppressed Sicilian Roman citizens, who in their desperation cried out: "Civis romanus sum".

At the age of 57, in 1955 for the first time Chaudhuri went abroad. After coming back he wrote A Passage to England (1959). In this book he talked about his visit of five weeks to England, and more briefly about his two weeks in Paris and one week in Rome. During this time away from his home in Delhi, he visited museums, galleries, cathedrals, country houses, and attended plays and concerts. Chaudhuri reflects on his experiences from the perspective of a man who had grown up in the British Empire and was now the citizen of an independent India.

His later works include personal essays, biographies and historical studies.

Honours

 Duff Cooper Memorial Award in 1967
 Ananda Purashkar in 1988
 DLitt from Oxford University in 1990.
 Vidyasagar Purashkar in 1997 by the Govt of West Bengal
 Desikottama in 1997 by Viswabharati

Books
 The Autobiography of an Unknown Indian (1951)
 A Passage to England (1959)
 The Continent of Circe (1965)
 The Intellectual in India (1967)
 To Live or Not to Live (1971)
 Scholar Extraordinary, The Life of Professor the Right Honourable Friedrich Max Muller, P.C. (1974)
 Culture in the Vanity Bag (1976)
 Clive of India (1975)
 Hinduism: A Religion to Live by (1979)
 Thy Hand, Great Anarch! (1987)
 Three Horsemen of the New Apocalypse (1997)
 The East is East and West is West (collection of pre-published essays)
 From the Archives of a Centenarian (collection of pre-published essays)
 Why I Mourn for England (collection of pre-published essays)

References

External links

 
 
 
 Nirad C. Chaudhuri at the West Bengal Public Library Network
 Chadhuri's Blue Plaque at Lathbury Road in North Oxford
 Naras page
 Merchant Ivory documentary

1897 births
1999 deaths
Bengali historians
Bengali writers
Writers from Kolkata
Honorary Commanders of the Order of the British Empire
Historians of South Asia
Indian autobiographers
Indian centenarians
Indian male essayists
Indian literary critics
Indian memoirists
Indian political writers
Surendranath College alumni
Scottish Church College alumni
University of Calcutta alumni
Recipients of the Sahitya Akademi Award in English
Critics of Islam
20th-century Indian biographers
20th-century Indian historians
20th-century Indian essayists
20th-century Indian male writers
20th-century memoirists
Men centenarians
People associated with Shillong
People from Kishoreganj District